Mohsen Beheshti Rad (born 12 September 1984) is an Iranian mountaineer and representative in ice climbing, world and Asian champion.

Records and achievements

Medals 

 2018: Asian ice climbing champion
 2022: world champion in ice climbing
 2023: Asian ice climbing champion

Race results 

* note: on the right are the last races of the year

References

External links 

 Mohsen Beheshti Rad in the International Mountaineering Federation database
 Theuiaa.org: ice climbing competition results (2002-)
 Iceclimbing.sport: results of the WC 2023 Chong Song - men's speed

1984 births
Living people
Iranian rock climbers
Ice climbers